Elk River station is a commuter rail station in Elk River, Minnesota, located at 17200 Twin Lakes Road. It is served by the Northstar Commuter Rail line. The station features bicycle lockers and a park and ride lot with capacity for 754 vehicles. The commute time to downtown Minneapolis from this station is about 41 minutes. The normal fare to downtown Minneapolis from this station is $4.50 on weekdays and $4.00 on weekends and holidays; the fare to and from any other station is $3.00 on weekdays and $2.50 on weekends and holidays.

Notes

External links
Elk River Station, Northstar Corridor Development Authority (NCDA)

Northstar Line stations
Railway stations in the United States opened in 2009
Buildings and structures in Sherburne County, Minnesota
Transportation in Sherburne County, Minnesota
2009 establishments in Minnesota